Berserker is an EP, the final release by the Austin, Texas, noise rock band Scratch Acid. The songs can also be found as tracks 22-27 on the compilation album The Greatest Gift.

Berserker reached #7 in the UK Indie Chart.

Track listing

Chart positions

Personnel 
Scratch Acid
Brett Bradford – guitar
David Wm. Sims – bass guitar
Rey Washam – drums
David Yow – vocals
Production and additional personnel
Kerry Crafton – production, engineering
Scratch Acid – production
Mark Todd – illustrations

References

External links 
 
 Touch & Go Records page on the album

1986 EPs
Scratch Acid albums
Touch and Go Records EPs